UTC+08:00 is an identifier for a time offset from UTC of +08:00.

With an estimated population of 1.708 billion living within the time zone, roughly 24% of the world population, it is the most populous time zone in the world, as well as a possible candidate for ASEAN Common Time.

This time zone is used in all predominantly Chinese-speaking regions, giving international Chinese websites and TV channels the same time.

In Indonesia, it is known as Central Indonesian Time while in Western Australia, it is known as Australian Western Standard Time.

As standard time (year-round)
Principal cities: Shanghai, Beijing, Taipei, Hong Kong, Kuala Lumpur, Singapore, Manila, Makassar, Denpasar, Perth, Irkutsk

North Asia
Russia – Irkutsk Time
Far Eastern Federal District
Buryatia
Siberian Federal District
Irkutsk Oblast

East Asia
Mainland China – China Standard Time
Hong Kong – Hong Kong Time (Hong Kong Standard Time)
Macau – Macau Time (Macau Standard Time)
Taiwan – National Standard Time
Mongolia – Time in Mongolia
Eastern part, including Dornod, Sükhbaatar, Ulaanbaatar

Southeast Asia 
Brunei – Brunei Darussalam Standard Time
Indonesia – Central Indonesia Time
Parts of Kalimantan:
East Kalimantan
North Kalimantan
South Kalimantan
Lesser Sunda Islands
Bali
East Nusa Tenggara 
West Nusa Tenggara
All provinces in Sulawesi
Malaysia – Malaysia Standard Time
Philippines – Philippine Standard Time
Singapore – Singapore Standard Time

Oceania
Australia
Western Australia (except Eucla and nearby areas, including Caiguna, Cocklebiddy, Madura and Mundrabilla, unofficially observes UTC+08:45)

Antarctica

Southern Ocean
Some bases in Antarctica. See also Time in Antarctica
Australia
Casey Station

Discrepancies between official UTC+08:00 and geographical UTC+08:00
This section is only partly updated for  longitudes using other time zones. This concerns areas within 112°30′ E to 127°30′ E longitude.
 Parts of Russia, including very easternmost parts of Krasnoyarsk Krai, where UTC+07:00 is used, and Zabaykalsky Krai and most of western Sakha Republic where UTC+09:00 is used.
Parts of Indonesia, including eastern East Java with its capital city Surabaya, most of Central Kalimantan with its capital city Palangka Raya, and eastern part of West Kalimantan, where UTC+07:00 is used, and some of the western islands in the province of Maluku and North Maluku where UTC+09:00 is used.
 East Timor, where UTC+09:00 is used.
Parts of Okinawa Prefecture, Japan, including Sakishima Islands with its westernmost point Yonaguni, western parts of Kerama Islands, and some islands of the western Okinawa Islands, where UTC+09:00 is used.
 The western parts of Korea, including the North Korean capital city, Pyongyang and South Korean capital city, Seoul, where UTC+09:00 is used.

Areas outside UTC+08:00 longitudes using UTC+08:00 time

Areas between 127°30′ E and 142°30′ E ("physical" UTC+09:00)
Parts of northeast China including the eastern half of Heilongjiang Province and the Yanbian Korean Autonomous Prefecture in Jilin Province.
Easternmost parts of Western Australia.

Areas between 97°30′ E and 112°30′ E ("physical" UTC+07:00)
From south to north:
Singapore
Malaysia:
Western part of Sarawak in Malaysian Borneo.
Peninsular Malaysia, where the nation's capital Kuala Lumpur is.
Many parts of central China including:
Hainan
Guangxi
Yunnan
Guizhou
Sichuan
Chongqing
Shaanxi
Ningxia
Gansu
western two-third of Hunan
western half of:
Hubei
Shanxi
Inner Mongolia, including its capital Hohhot.
western third of:
Guangdong
Henan
Most of central Mongolia including the capital Ulaanbaatar.
In Russia, most of:
Irkutsk Oblast
Buryatia

Areas between 82°30′ E and 97°30′ E ("physical" UTC+06:00)
Parts of China
most of Xinjiang Uyghur Autonomous Region (although many locals set their clocks at UTC+06:00 even if it is officially UTC+08:00, in any case work and shop schedules are two hours after Shanghai and Beijing). See also Time in China.
most of Tibet Autonomous Region
Western Mongolia.

Areas between 67°30′ E and 82°30′ E ("physical" UTC+05:00)
Parts of western China including western Xinjiang province (Kashgar) (although most locals observe UTC+06:00 even if it is officially UTC+08:00).

Historical time offsets 
The southern half of Vietnam (Republic of Vietnam) was formerly part of this time zone prior to the national reunification on 30 April 1975, making it one hour ahead of North Vietnam. After 1975, the whole country came under the North Vietnamese time zone, UTC+07:00.

According to Presidential Decree 41/1987, Indonesia's ex-province of Timor Timur used this time zone with neighboring East Nusa Tenggara and other provinces in Lesser Sunda Islands, parts of Kalimantan and Sulawesi until independence as East Timor, which the country changed to UTC+09:00 as official time zone.

See also
ASEAN Common Time
Hong Kong Time
Philippine Standard Time
Singapore Standard Time
Time in Australia
Time in Brunei
Time in Cambodia
Time in China
Time in Indonesia
Time in Laos
Time in Malaysia
Time in Mongolia
Time in Russia
Time in Taiwan
Time in Vietnam

References

External links

 History of Hong Kong Time Service 

UTC offsets
Time in Singapore
Time in Australia
Time in China
Time in Taiwan
Time in Southeast Asia
Time in Malaysia
Time in Indonesia
Time in the Philippines